The Sittaung Bridge at Moppalin is a steel bridge spanning the Sittaung river between Waw, Bago Region and Moppalin, Mon State of Myanmar. It is the second bridge across the Sittaung. The older Sittaung Bridge at Theinzayat cannot serve heavier trucks.

References

Bridges in Myanmar
Buildings and structures in Bago Region
Buildings and structures in Mon State